Monocentris japonica, the Japanese pineapplefish, is a pinecone fish of the family Monocentridae, found in the tropical  Indo-West Pacific Oceans, at depths between 2 and 100 m and can be found on both rocky and coral reefs. The fish is nocturnal and shelters in caves and under ledges during the day.

Morphology
The pineconefish is yellow with distinct large scales outlined in black.  It has light-producing organs filled with luminescent bacteria on each side of the lower jaw, the purpose of which is not known, but may help it to see at night or to attract prey.  The fish grows to 17 cm, but is more commonly found up to 12 cm.

Pinecone fish do not have scales, and are instead covered in scutes. Scutes are similar to scales and serve the same function. Unlike the scales of fish, which are formed from the epidermis, scutes are formed in the lower vascular layer of the skin and the epidermal element is only the top surface. Forming in the living dermis, the scutes produce a horny outer layer, that is superficially similar to that of scales.

Scute comes from Latin for shield, and can take the form of:
 an external shield-like bony plate, or
 a modified, thickened scale that often is keeled or spiny, or
 a projecting, modified (rough and strongly ridged) scale, usually associated with the lateral line, or on the caudal peduncle forming caudal keels, or along the ventral profile.

In captivity
Pinecone fish are often kept by aquarists because they are not aggressive and easy to keep. In aquaria, they are usually fed fresh marine foods or brine shrimp.

Gallery

References

 Tony Ayling & Geoffrey Cox, Collins Guide to the Sea Fishes of New Zealand,  (William Collins Publishers Ltd, Auckland, New Zealand 1982) 

Monocentridae
Fish described in 1782
Taxa named by Martinus Houttuyn